The Șieu is a left tributary of the river Someșul Mare in Romania. It discharges into the Someșul Mare near Beclean.

Towns and villages

The following towns and villages are situated along the river Șieu, from source to mouth: Șieu, Mărișelu, Șieu-Măgheruș, Șieu-Odorhei, Șintereag.

Tributaries

The following rivers are tributaries to the river Șieu:

Left: Dipșa, Bretea, Agriș

Right: Şieuţ, Ardan, Măgura, Budac & Budăcelul, Bistrița, Măgheruș, Rosua

References

Rivers of Romania
Rivers of Bistrița-Năsăud County